Gabriel de Castilla Base is a Spanish research station located on Deception Island, South Shetland Islands, Antarctica. The station was constructed in late 1989.
The station is named for Gabriel de Castilla, a 17th century Spanish navigator and according to some reports the first person to sight the mainland of Antarctica.

See also
 Juan Carlos I Antarctic Base
 Deception Station
 List of Antarctic research stations
 List of Antarctic field camps

References

Outposts of Antarctica
Outposts of the South Shetland Islands
1990 establishments in Antarctica
Research in Spain
Spain and the Antarctic
1990 establishments in Spain